Roncalli College is a Catholic college in Timaru, New Zealand. It was named after Pope John XXIII, whose birth name was Angelo Giuseppe Roncalli. It is a co-educational college, with approximately 500 students from Year 9 to Year 13, it is situated on Craigie Avenue, next to the Sacred Heart Basilica.

It practices NCEA examinations for its senior students. In 2005 87.7% of Roncalli students achieved NCEA Level 1, 70.3% of students achieved Level 2, 71.2% achieved Level 3, and 66.7% achieved University Entrance.

It has a high participation rate in sports, with netball, rugby, basketball, and especially rowing and mountain-biking among the most popular sports. Other available sports are badminton, volleyball, soccer, tennis, cricket, and hockey, among others. While there is a strong focus on sports, cultural activities include occasional hakas and church services.

It also has a foreign student population, with some students coming from Europe, South America, Asia, and the Pacific Islands.

Roncalli College was awarded the 2006 Education Outdoors New Zealand (EONZ)  

Programme Award was won by Roncalli College,  

Roncalli College was awarded the 2006 Education Outdoors New Zealand (EONZ) Programme Award By EONZ for its years 10, 12, and 13 Outdoor Education  

Roncalli College was awarded the 2006 Education Outdoors New Zealand (EONZ) Programme Award By EONZ for its years 10, 12, and 13 Outdoor Education programs.

History
Roncalli College was created by merging St Patrick's High School and Mercy College in 1981. Roncalli is now on the site, and most of the buildings are remnants from the days of the single-sex schools. St Patrick's was the local high school for Catholic boys, run by the Marist order, and Mercy College was the local Catholic school for girls, run by the Mercy sisters, from their convent, which was situated on what is now the rugby field also known as the thunder dome. The schools were separated by the "Iron Curtain" or "Brown Curtain", a corrugated iron fence that ran the length of the boundary between the two schools, which kept the boys and girls separated. The penalties for being on the wrong side of the fence were rather severe, any boy caught on the wrong side of the fence without a valid reason was invariably caned. In the last days of St Pats and Mercy, the pupils from St Pats were instructed by the Rector to tear down the fence as a prelude to amalgamation. The event was photographed and featured in the Timaru Herald newspaper.

In October 2007, Roncalli College celebrated its 25th Jubilee.

Notable alumni 

 Bronson Beri – basketball player
 Deborah Geels – diplomat

Notes

External links
 Roncalli College Website

Educational institutions established in 1982
Timaru
Secondary schools in Canterbury, New Zealand
Catholic secondary schools in New Zealand
1982 establishments in New Zealand